Larrinaga may refer to:

Enrique Larrinaga Esnal (1910–1993), Spanish football player
Jon Larrinaga (born 1990), Spanish cyclist
Joseba Larrinaga (1968–2013), Spanish paralympic athlete
Tulio Larrínaga (1847–1917), Resident Commissioner of Puerto Rico

de Larrinaga
Javier Ruiz de Larrinaga (born 1979), Spanish racing cyclist
Rupert de Larrinaga (born 1928), British skier of Basque descent

See also
Larrañaga (disambiguation)